is a Japanese former swimmer who competed in the 2000 Summer Olympics.

References

1981 births
Living people
Japanese female breaststroke swimmers
Olympic swimmers of Japan
Swimmers at the 2000 Summer Olympics
Asian Games medalists in swimming
Swimmers at the 1998 Asian Games
Swimmers at the 2002 Asian Games
Asian Games bronze medalists for Japan
Medalists at the 1998 Asian Games
21st-century Japanese women